Herdi Siamand (born 13 January 1983) is an Iraqi professional footballer who currently plays for Al-Mina'a in the Iraqi Premier League.

International debut
On March 18, 2016 Herdi made his first international cap with Iraq against Syria in a friendly match.

References

External links
 

Iraqi footballers
1983 births
Living people
Iraq international footballers
Erbil SC players
Zakho FC players
Al-Mina'a SC players
Association football central defenders